Metrosideros  is a genus of approximately 60 trees, shrubs, and vines mostly found in the Pacific region in the family Myrtaceae. Most of the tree forms are small, but some are exceptionally large, the New Zealand species in particular. The name derives from the Ancient Greek metra or "heartwood" and sideron or "iron". Perhaps the best-known species are the pōhutukawa (M. excelsa), northern (M. robusta) and southern rātā (M. umbellata) of New Zealand, and ōhia lehua (M. polymorpha), from the Hawaiian Islands.

Distribution

Metrosideros is one of the most widely spread flowering plant genera in the Pacific. New Caledonia has 21 species of Metrosideros, New Zealand has 12, New Guinea has seven and Hawaii has 5. The genus is present on most other high Pacific Islands, including Solomon Islands, Vanuatu, Fiji, Samoa, Cook islands, French Polynesia, Bonin Islands and Lord Howe Island, but absent from Micronesia . The genus is also represented by one species in the Philippines, one in South America (Chile and Argentina), and one outlier in South Africa. Metrosideros seeds are very lightweight and easily dispersed by wind. The seeds can also survive freezing temperatures, and up to 30 days submerged in salt water and still germinate. which probably accounts for their wide distribution. They are often found as pioneer trees on lava flows and on mountain ridges.

Despite the clear propensity towards long-distance dispersal, this genus does not occur in mainland Australia.

Fossil record

For some time it had been hypothesised that Metrosideros evolved in New Zealand, and dispersed from there throughout the Pacific. This was due to the long fossil record of Metrosideros in New Zealand  coupled with the absence of any Metrosideros fossils on other Gondwanan landmasses. The oldest conclusive fossil evidence of Metrosideros in New Zealand is fossil fruits from the Miocene aged Manuherikia sediments of Central Otago. There is a fossil pollen record going back much further, but it has been shown that Metrosideros pollen is very similar morphologically to many other genera within the family Myrtaceae and as such, fossil pollen cannot be reliably used as an oldest record of the genus.

The oldest conclusive record of Metrosideros are fossil fruits and flowers of Metrosideros leunigii, an extinct species, from Oligocene aged sediments in Tasmania, Australia. This is very curious considering that Metrosideros is one of the most widely spread plants in the Pacific, and is not present in Australia today. These fossils may also point towards an Australian origin for the genus.

Cultivation
Metrosideros are often cultivated for their showy flowers, as street trees or in home gardens. The flowers are generally red, but some cultivars have orange, yellow or white flowers. Some names listed in horticultural catalogues and other publications, such as M. villosa and M. vitiensis, are actually the names of varieties or cultivars (usually of M. collina) rather than valid scientific species. The pōhutukawa of New Zealand has several cultivars grown in Australia, Hawaii and California and it has been planted successfully in the north of Spain and on the Scilly Isles off the south-west coast of Britain, but the species is considered an invasive pest in parts of South Africa and in the Azores. Metrosideros kermadecensis is recently naturalised in Hawaii, and has the potential to become a pest. In turn, various cultivars of M. collina and M. polymorpha are widely grown in New Zealand under various names. Metrosideros umbellata occurs naturally south of mainland New Zealand in the Auckland Islands at 50° South latitude, and is the hardiest member of the genus, and a few cultivated specimens are growing in Scotland.

Metrosideros species

New Caledonia 
 Metrosideros brevistylis 
 Metrosideros cacuminum 
 Metrosideros cherrieri 
 Metrosideros dolichandra 
 Metrosideros elegans 
 Metrosideros engleriana 
 Metrosideros humboldtiana 
 Metrosideros laurifolia 
 Metrosideros longipetiolata 
 Metrosideros microphylla 
 Metrosideros nitida 
 Metrosideros operculata 
 Metrosideros oreomyrtus 
 Metrosideros paniensis 
 Metrosideros patens 
 Metrosideros porphyrea 
 Metrosideros punctata 
 Metrosideros rotundifolia 
 Metrosideros tardiflora 
 Metrosideros tetrasticha 
 Metrosideros whitakeri 

South America
 Metrosideros stipularis 

South Africa
 Metrosideros angustifolia 

New Zealand

 Metrosideros albiflora  - Large white rātā
 Metrosideros bartlettii  - Bartlett's rātā
 Metrosideros carminea  - Carmine rātā
 Metrosideros colensoi  - Colenso's rātā
 Metrosideros diffusa  - White rātā
 Metrosideros excelsa  - Pōhutukawa
 Metrosideros fulgens  - Scarlet rātā
 Metrosideros kermadecensis  - Kermadec pōhutukawa (Kermadec Islands)
 Metrosideros parkinsonii  - Parkinson's rātā
 Metrosideros perforata  - Small white rātā
 Metrosideros robusta  - Northern rātā
 Metrosideros umbellata  - Southern rātā

New Guinea
 Metrosideros arfakensis 
 Metrosideros cordata 
 Metrosideros ovata 
 Metrosideros parallelinervis 
 Metrosideros ramiflora 
 Metrosideros regelii 
 Metrosideros whiteana 

Philippines
 Metrosideros halconensis 

Hawaii
 Metrosideros macropus  - Lehua mamo (Oahu)
 Metrosideros polymorpha  - Ōhia lehua
 Metrosideros rugosa  - Lehua papa (Oahu)
 Metrosideros tremuloides  - Lehua āhihi (Oahu)
 Metrosideros waialealae  (Kauai, Molokai, and Maui)

French Polynesia, Pitcairn and the Cook Islands
 Metrosideros collina 

Fiji, Samoa and Vanuatu
 Metrosideros gregoryi  (Samoa)
 Metrosideros ochrantha   (Fiji)
 Metrosideros tabwemasanaensis  (Vanuatu)
 Metrosideros vitiensis 

Solomon Islands
 Metrosideros salomonensis 
 Metrosideros tetragyna 

Lord Howe Island
 Metrosideros nervulosa  - Mountain rose
 Metrosideros sclerocarpa 

Ogasawara Islands
 Metrosideros boninensis

References

Further reading
 Simpson, P., 2005. Pōhutukawa & Rātā: New Zealand's Iron-Hearted Trees. Te Papa Press. 346 pp.
 Wagner, W.L., D. R. Herbst, and S.H. Sohmer. 1999. Manual of the Flowering Plants of Hawaii. Revised edition. University of Hawaii Press and Bishop Museum Press, Honolulu. 1919 pp.

External links

 
Myrtaceae genera
Trees of Hawaii
Trees of New Zealand
Flora of New Caledonia
Taxa named by Joseph Banks
Taxa named by Joseph Gaertner